These are the results of the men's foil team competition in fencing at the 2004 Summer Olympics in Athens.  A total of 30 men from eight nations competed in this event.  Competition took place in the Fencing Hall at the Helliniko Olympic Complex on August 21.

Tournament results
The team competition was a single-elimination tournament among the eight teams.  Quarterfinal losers continued to play classification matches to determine final placement from first to eighth.  Each team match consisted of a set of nine individual matches, comprising a full round-robin schedule among the three fencers on each team.

Brackets

Quarterfinals

Semifinals

Classification matches

Seventh place match

Fifth place match

Bronze medal match

Gold medal match

References

Yahoo! Sports Athens 2004 Summer Olympics Fencing Results

Men's foil team
Men's events at the 2004 Summer Olympics